Nena (born Gabriele Susanne Kerner, 1960) is a German singer.

Nena may also refer to:

 Nena (band), the band organized by the singer, active from 1982 until 1987
 Nena (album), the debut album of the band.

Songs 
 "Nena" (song), by Miguel Bosé
 "Nena", the B-side for "Suavecito", by Malo
 "Searching for Nena", a song by Nick Warren

Other 

 Nena people, an ethnic group in Tanzania
 Nena of Nata and Nena, Aztec mythical figure a.k.a. Citlalicue
 Nena (film), a 2014 German-Dutch co-production

Acronym 

 Nena (supercontinent), derived from Northern Europe and North America
 National Emergency Number Association, USA
 Nokomis East Neighborhood Association, in Minneapolis
 Northeastern Neo-Aramaic language group

People 

 Nena (name)

See also 

 Nina (disambiguation)